The Centrale Veiligheidsdienst (CVD) was a Dutch security agency founded in 1946 as the successor to the Bureau Nationale Veiligheid. It was transformed into the Binnenlandse Veiligheidsdienst in 1949.

Foundation
World War II had made it clear to the Dutch government how important a good intelligence service was, and wished to install a more general and permanent institution than the Bureau Nationale Veiligheid (BNV), whose primary mission had been to roll up remnants of German intelligence services, monitor former collaborators with the German regime, and track separatists in Dutch Indonesia. Louis Einthoven, head of the BNV, advised the government to model a security agency after the British MI5, meaning it would be responsible for gathering intelligence but have not the power to enforce laws, in order to prevent the agency from being a secret police like the German Gestapo.

The CVD was founded with a (secret) Royal Decree on 9 April 1946, and Einthoven was its first director. It was run under the Ministry of General Affairs, headed by prime minister Louis Beel.

References

Sources
 , Terug naar de bron. Vrijheid, onvrijheid en de dienst in de jaren veertig en vijftig, Uitg. Algemene Inlichtingen- en Veiligheidsdienst, Zoetermeer 2021.

External links 
 Voorlopers Binnenlandse Veiligheidsdienst: Bureau Nationale Veiligheid & Centrale Veiligheidsdienst

1946 establishments in the Netherlands
Government agencies established in 1946
Dutch intelligence agencies
Domestic intelligence agencies